Strymon acis, the Bartram's scrub-hairstreak, is a butterfly of the family Lycaenidae. It is found in southern Florida and the West Indies. The habitat consists of openings in pine woods.

The wingspan is 22–29 mm. The upperside is dark gray. The underside of the wings is pale gray with white lines and contrasting thinner black lines.

The larvae feed on the flower buds and young fruits of Croton linearis.

Subspecies
Strymon acis acis
Strymon acis bartrami (Comstock & Huntington, 1943) (southern Florida)
Strymon acis casasi (Comstock & Huntington, 1943) (Cuba)
Strymon acis mars (Fabricius, 1776)

References

acis
Butterflies of the Caribbean
Butterflies of North America
Butterflies described in 1773
Taxa named by Dru Drury